The Pittsfield Senators were a minor league baseball team that played from 1970 to 1975 in the Washington Senators minor league system. In 1972 when the Senators moved to Texas and became the Texas Rangers, Pittsfield changed its name to the Pittsfield Rangers (1972 to 1975).

They were located in Pittsfield, Massachusetts, played in the Double-A Eastern League. Their home ballpark was Wahconah Park.

The Rangers moved their Double-A affiliate to San Antonio of the Texas League in 1976 and were immediately replaced in Pittsfield by the Milwaukee Brewers, who renamed the team the Berkshire Brewers.

Yearly record

Future Major Leaguers

Larry Biittner (1970)
Don Castle (1970)
Dave Moates (1970–1972)
Rick Stelmaszek (1970)
John Wockenfuss (1970–1972)
Steve Foucault (1970)
Bill Gogolewski (1970)
Rick Henninger (1970–1971)
Jeff Terpko (1970–1971, 1974)
Mike Thompson (1970)
Bill Fahey (1971)
Jim Kremmel (1971–1972)
Joe Lovitto (1971)
Bill Madlock (1971–1972)
Rick Waits (1971–1972)
Jim Kremmel (1971–1972)
Lew Beasley (1972–1975)
Roy Howell (1972–1973)
Pete Mackanin (1972)
Greg Pryor (1972, 1974)
Tom Robson (1972–1973)
Dave Criscione (1973)
Mike Cubbage (1973)
Ken Pape (1973–1974)
Jim Sundberg (1973)
Stan Thomas (1973)
Doug Ault (1974–1975)
Brian Doyle (1974)
Ron Pruitt (1974)
Roy Smalley III (1974)
Jim Umbarger (1974)
Len Barker (1975)
Tommy Boggs (1975)
Dan Duran (1975)
Greg Mahlberg (1975)
John Poloni (1975)
Keith Smith (1975)
John Sutton (1975)
Bump Wills (1975)

Players with previous Major League experience

Toby Harrah (1970)
Gene Martin (1970)
Charley Walters (1971–1972)
Dick Such (1973)
Tommy Cruz (1974)
Marty Martínez (1975)

1970 establishments in Massachusetts
1975 disestablishments in Massachusetts
Baseball teams established in 1970
Baseball teams disestablished in 1975
Defunct baseball teams in Massachusetts
Defunct Eastern League (1938–present) teams
Baseball teams in Pittsfield, Massachusetts
Professional baseball teams in Massachusetts